Vian Bakir is a professor of journalism at Bangor University in Wales in the United Kingdom who researches political communication, propaganda and national security.

Among her contributions on the relationship between political communication and contemporary agenda-building, Vian Bakir defined Strategic Political Communication (SPC) as comprising 'political communication that is manipulative in intent, utilizes social scientific techniques and heuristic devices to understand human motivation, human behavior and the media environment in order to inform effectively what should be communicated – encompassing its detail and overall direction – and what should be withheld, with the aim of taking into account and influencing public opinion, and creating strategic alliances and an enabling environment for government policies – both at home and abroad'. Bakir (2010) argues that the era of web-based participatory media and convergence cultures, non-governmental and non-state actors, with their own virtual communities and networks that cut across national borders, use what she calls a 'sousveillant assemblage' to wield discursive power.

Bakir has also written on the subject of how to hold Intelligence elites publicly accountable, detailing many barriers and failures in how civil society does this, but issuing guidelines and retaining some practical optimism that this can be improved.

Research 
Bakir has written across four main areas of research:
 Fake news, disinformation, propaganda and issues of trust in journalism;
 Dataveillance, surveillance, sousveillance, emotional AI.
 National and international agenda-building struggles conducted via the media;
 The security state and public accountability.

Her research in these areas has influenced the discourse and understanding of political audiences across governments and legislatures (European, national); professional public/political communicators (global, UK, Wales); India’s Supreme Court; journalists; NGOs; artists and the public.

In 2020 with Andrew McStay, Bakir submitted evidence to the UK Parliament on Electoral Campaigning Transparency.

Major works 
Bakir's books include: 
Bakir, V. 2018. Intelligence Elites and Public Accountability: Relationships of Influence with Civil Society. London: Routledge.
Bakir, V. 2013. Torture, Intelligence and Sousveillance in the War on Terror: Agenda–Building Struggles.
Bakir, V. 2010. Sousveillance, Media and Strategic Political Communication: Iraq, USA, UK. New York: Continuum.
Bakir, V. & D.Barlow, (eds.) 2007. Communication in the Age of Suspicion: Trust and the Media. Basingstoke: Palgrave-Macmillan.

References

External links 

Living people
Propaganda theorists
Internet theorists
Media critics
Works about security and surveillance
Works about intelligence agencies
Year of birth missing (living people)